Ectoedemia is a genus of moths in the family Nepticulidae. It consists of the subgenera Ectoedemia, Etainia, Fomoria and Zimmermannia. This genus was established by August Busck in 1907.

Species
Note that some species have multiple entries, since they are found in different regions.

Species found in Africa

Ectoedemia alexandria Scoble, 1983
Ectoedemia bicarina Scoble, 1983
Ectoedemia capensis Scoble, 1983
Ectoedemia commiphorella Scoble, 1978
Ectoedemia craspedota (Vári, 1963)
Ectoedemia crispae Scoble, 1983
Ectoedemia crypsixantha (Meyrick, 1918)
Ectoedemia denticulata Scoble, 1983
Ectoedemia digitata Scoble, 1983
Ectoedemia expeditionis Mey, 2004
Ectoedemia furcella Scoble, 1983
Ectoedemia fuscata (Janse, 1948)
Ectoedemia gambiana (Gustafsson, 1972)
Ectoedemia grandinosa (Meyrick, 1911)
Ectoedemia guerkiae Scoble, 1983
Ectoedemia gymnosporiae (Vári, 1955)
Ectoedemia hobohmi (Janse, 1948)
Ectoedemia incisaevora Scoble, 1983
Ectoedemia indicaevora Scoble, 1983
Ectoedemia insulata (Meyrick, 1911)
Ectoedemia jupiteri Scoble, 1983
Ectoedemia kharuxabi Mey, 2004
Ectoedemia knysnaensis Scoble, 1983
Ectoedemia kowynensis Scoble, 1983
Ectoedemia krugerensis (Scoble, 1983)
Ectoedemia leptodictyae Scoble, 1983
Ectoedemia limburgensis Scoble, 1983
Ectoedemia lucidae Scoble, 1983
Ectoedemia macrochaeta (Meyrick, 1921)
Ectoedemia malelanensis Scoble, 1983
Ectoedemia maritima Scoble, 1983
Ectoedemia mauni Scoble, 1979
Ectoedemia myrtinaecola Scoble, 1983
Ectoedemia nigricapitella (Janse, 1948)
Ectoedemia nigrimacula (Janse, 1948)
Ectoedemia nigrisquama Scoble, 1983
Ectoedemia nylstroomensis Scoble, 1983
Ectoedemia oleivora (Vári, 1955)
Ectoedemia pappeivora (Vári, 1963)
Ectoedemia portensis Scoble, 1983
Ectoedemia primaria (Meyrick, 1913)
Ectoedemia psarodes (Vári, 1963)
Ectoedemia rhabdophora Scoble, 1983
Ectoedemia royenicola (Vári, 1955)
Ectoedemia ruwenzoriensis (Bradley, 1965)
Ectoedemia scabridae Scoble, 1983
Ectoedemia scobleella Minet, 2004
Ectoedemia simiicola Scoble, 1983
Ectoedemia stimulata (Meyrick, 1913)
Ectoedemia subnitescens (Meyrick, 1937)
Ectoedemia tecomariae (Vári, 1955)
Ectoedemia tersiusi Mey, 2004
Ectoedemia thermae Scoble, 1983
Ectoedemia uisebi Mey, 2004
Ectoedemia umdoniella Scoble, 1983
Ectoedemia undatae Scoble, 1983
Ectoedemia vannifera (Meyrick, 1914)
Ectoedemia wilkinsoni Scoble, 1983
Ectoedemia zimbabwiensis (Scoble, 1983)

Species found in Australia
Ectoedemia hadronycha Hoare, 2000
Ectoedemia pelops Hoare, 2000
Ectoedemia squamibunda Hoare, 2000

Species found in the Indo-Malayan ecozone
Ectoedemia festivitatis van Nieukerken, 2008
Ectoedemia glycystrota (Meyrick, 1928)
Ectoedemia sporadopa (Meyrick, 1911)

Species found in North and South America
The following species are found in North America:

Ectoedemia acanthella Wilkinson & Newton, 1981
Ectoedemia andrella Wilkinson, 1981
Ectoedemia anguinella (Clemens, 1864)
Ectoedemia argyropeza (Zeller, 1839)
Ectoedemia canutus Wilkinson & Scoble, 1979
Ectoedemia castaneae Busck, 1913 - American chestnut moth
Ectoedemia chlorantis Meyrick, 1908
Ectoedemia clemensella (Chambers, 1873)
Ectoedemia coruscella Wilkinson, 1981
Ectoedemia grandisella (Chambers, 1878)
Ectoedemia heinrichi Busck, 1914
Ectoedemia helenella Wilkinson, 1981
Ectoedemia hypericella (Braun, 1925)
Ectoedemia marmaropa (Braun, 1925)
Ectoedemia mesoloba Davis, 1978
Ectoedemia minimella (Zetterstedt, 1839)
Ectoedemia nyssaefoliella (Chambers, 1880)
Ectoedemia obrutella (Zeller, 1873)
Ectoedemia ochrefasciella (Chambers, 1873) - hard maple budminer moth
Ectoedemia phleophaga Busck, 1914 - phleophagan chestnut moth
Ectoedemia piperella Wilkinson & Newton, 1981
Ectoedemia platanella (Clemens, 1861) - sycamore leaf blotch miner
Ectoedemia platea (Clemens, 1861)
Ectoedemia populella Busck, 1907
Ectoedemia pteliaeella (Chambers, 1880)
Ectoedemia quadrinotata (Braun, 1917)
Ectoedemia reneella Wilkinson, 1981
Ectoedemia rubifoliella (Clemens, 1860)
Ectoedemia sericopeza (Zeller, 1839)
Ectoedemia similella (Braun, 1917)
Ectoedemia trinotata (Braun, 1914)
Ectoedemia ulmella (Braun, 1912)
Ectoedemia virgulae (Braun, 1927)
Ectoedemia weaveri (Stainton, 1855)

The following species are found in South America, but not in North America:
Ectoedemia diskusi Puplesis & Robinson, 2000
Ectoedemia fuscivittata Puplesis & Robinson, 2000
Ectoedemia molybditis (Zeller, 1877)
Ectoedemia repanda Puplesis & Diškus, 2002
Ectoedemia tabulosa Puplesis & Diškus, 2002

Species found in the Palearctic ecozone
The following species are found in Europe:

Ectoedemia aegaeica Z. & A. Lastuvka & Johansson, 1998
Ectoedemia aegilopidella (Klimesch, 1978)
Ectoedemia agrimoniae (Frey, 1858)
Ectoedemia albibimaculella (Larsen, 1927)
Ectoedemia albifasciella (Heinemann, 1871)
Ectoedemia algeriensis van Nieukerken, 1985
Ectoedemia alnifoliae van Nieukerken, 1985
Ectoedemia amani Svensson, 1966
Ectoedemia andalusiae van Nieukerken, 1985
Ectoedemia angulifasciella (Stainton, 1849)
Ectoedemia arcuatella (Herrich-Schaffer, 1855)
Ectoedemia argyropeza (Zeller, 1839)
Ectoedemia atricollis (Stainton, 1857)
Ectoedemia atrifrontella (Stainton, 1851)
Ectoedemia caradjai (Groschke, 1944)
Ectoedemia cerris (Zimmermann, 1944)
Ectoedemia contorta van Nieukerken, 1985
Ectoedemia coscoja van Nieukerken, A. & Z. Lastuvka, 2009
Ectoedemia decentella (Herrich-Schaffer, 1855)
Ectoedemia deschkai (Klimesch, 1978)
Ectoedemia empetrifolii A. & Z. Lastuvka, 2000
Ectoedemia eriki A. & Z. Lastuvka, 2000
Ectoedemia erythrogenella (de Joannis, 1908)
Ectoedemia euphorbiella (Stainton, 1869)
Ectoedemia gilvipennella (Klimesch, 1946)
Ectoedemia groschkei (Skala, 1943)
Ectoedemia hannoverella (Glitz, 1872)
Ectoedemia haraldi (Soffner, 1942)
Ectoedemia heckfordi van Nieukerken, A. & Z. Lastuvka, 2009
Ectoedemia hendrikseni A.Lastuvka, Z. Lastuvka & van Nieukerken, 2009
Ectoedemia heringella (Mariani, 1939)
Ectoedemia heringi (Toll, 1934)
Ectoedemia hexapetalae (Szocs, 1957)
Ectoedemia hispanica van Nieukerken, 1985
Ectoedemia ilicis (Mendes, 1910)
Ectoedemia intimella (Zeller, 1848)
Ectoedemia jubae (Walsingham, 1908)
Ectoedemia klimeschi (Skala, 1933)
Ectoedemia leucothorax van Nieukerken, 1985
Ectoedemia liebwerdella Zimmermann, 1940
Ectoedemia liechtensteini (Zimmermann, 1944)
Ectoedemia liguricella Klimesch, 1953
Ectoedemia longicaudella Klimesch, 1953
Ectoedemia louisella (Sircom, 1849)
Ectoedemia luisae (Klimesch, 1978)
Ectoedemia mahalebella (Klimesch, 1936)
Ectoedemia minimella (Zetterstedt, 1839)
Ectoedemia monemvasiae van Nieukerken, 1985
Ectoedemia nigrifasciata (Walsingham, 1908)
Ectoedemia obtusa (Puplesis & Diskus, 1996)
Ectoedemia occultella (Linnaeus, 1767)
Ectoedemia phaeolepis van Nieukerken, A. & Z. Lastuvka, 2009
Ectoedemia phyllotomella (Klimesch, 1946)
Ectoedemia preisseckeri (Klimesch, 1941)
Ectoedemia pseudoilicis Z. & A. Lastuvka, 1998
Ectoedemia pubescivora (Weber, 1937)
Ectoedemia quinquella (Bedell, 1848)
Ectoedemia reichli Z. & A. Lastuvka, 1998
Ectoedemia rosae Van Nieukerken, 2011
Ectoedemia rubivora (Wocke, 1860)
Ectoedemia rufifrontella (Caradja, 1920)
Ectoedemia septembrella (Stainton, 1849)
Ectoedemia sericopeza (Zeller, 1839)
Ectoedemia similigena Puplesis, 1994
Ectoedemia spinosella (de Joannis, 1908)
Ectoedemia spiraeae Gregor & Povolny, 1983
Ectoedemia subbimaculella (Haworth, 1828)
Ectoedemia suberis (Stainton, 1869)
Ectoedemia terebinthivora (Klimesch, 1975)
Ectoedemia turbidella (Zeller, 1848)
Ectoedemia variicapitella (Chretien, 1908)
Ectoedemia vincamajorella (Hartig, 1964)
Ectoedemia viridissimella (Caradja, 1920)
Ectoedemia vivesi A.Lastuvka, Z. Lastuvka & van Nieukerken, 2009
Ectoedemia weaveri (Stainton, 1855)

The following species are found in the Palearctic ecozone, but not in Europe:

Ectoedemia admiranda Puplesis, 1984
Ectoedemia albida Puplesis, 1994
Ectoedemia aligera Puplesis, 1985
Ectoedemia arisi Puplesis, 1984
Ectoedemia asiatica Puplesis, 1988
Ectoedemia biarmata (Puplesis, 1994)
Ectoedemia capesella (Puplesis, 1985)
Ectoedemia cerviparadisicola Sato, 2012
Ectoedemia chasanella Puplesis, 1984
Ectoedemia christopheri Puplesis, 1985
Ectoedemia degeeri van Nieukerken, 2008
Ectoedemia ermolaevi Puplesis, 1985
Ectoedemia flavimacula Puplesis & Diškus, 1996
Ectoedemia hypericifolia (Kuroko, 1982)
Ectoedemia ingloria Puplesis, 1988
Ectoedemia insignata Puplesis, 1988
Ectoedemia insularis Puplesis, 1985
Ectoedemia ivinskisi Puplesis, 1984
Ectoedemia lacrimulae Puplesis & Diškus, 1996
Ectoedemia leptognathos Puplesis & Diškus, 1996
Ectoedemia maculata Puplesis, 1987
Ectoedemia nuristanica van Nieukerken, 1985
Ectoedemia olvina Puplesis, 1984
Ectoedemia ornatella Puplesis, 1984
Ectoedemia ortiva Rocienė & Stonis, 2013
Ectoedemia permira (Puplesis, 1984)
Ectoedemia peterseni (Puplesis, 1985)
Ectoedemia petrosa Puplesis, 1988
Ectoedemia philipi Puplesis, 1984
Ectoedemia picturata Puplesis, 1985
Ectoedemia pilosae Puplesis, 1984
Ectoedemia rosiphila Puplesis, 1992
Ectoedemia sabina (Puplesis, 1985)
Ectoedemia scoblei Puplesis, 1984
Ectoedemia sinevi Puplesis, 1985
Ectoedemia sivickisi Puplesis, 1984
Ectoedemia tadshikiella Puplesis, 1988
Ectoedemia tigrinella (Puplesis, 1985)
Ectoedemia trifasciata (Matsumura, 1931)

External links
Ectoedemia images at Consortium for the Barcode of Life
North American Moths – Pre-tortricid Micros at Moth Photographers Group. Mississippi State University.
The Nepticuloidea and Tisherioidea: Strategic Regional Revisions with a Global Review
Ectoedemia at Australian Faunal Directory

References

Nepticulidae
Moth genera
Monotrysia genera
Taxa named by August Busck
Taxonomy articles created by Polbot